The 2020 Limerick Senior Football Championship is the 124th edition of the Limerick GAA's premier club Gaelic football tournament for senior clubs in County Limerick, Ireland. 12 teams compete, with the winner representing not Limerick in the Munster Senior Club Football Championship due to the latter competition's cancellation. Due to the emergence of the COVID-19 pandemic, the format for this years championship was modified to employ four groups of three teams, rather than the usual two groups of six teams. The championship then progresses to a knock out stage.

Newcastle West were the defending champions after they defeated Oola in the 2019 final to claim their fourth S.F.C. crown.

This was Galtee Gaels return to the top flight for the first time since 1994 (a 25-season exodus) after claiming the 2019 Limerick I.F.C. title. They defeated Gerald Griffin's in a final replay. Galtee Gaels last won the I.F.C. in 1993.

Team Changes
The following teams have changed division since the 2019 championship season.

To S.F.C.
Promoted from 2019 I.F.C.
 Galtee Gaels  -  (Intermediate Champions)

From S.F.C.
Relegated to 2020 I.F.C.
 St. Senan's

Group stage
There are 4 groups called Group A, B, C and D. The top two finishers in each group will qualify for the quarter-finals. The bottom finishers of each group will qualify for the Relegation Play-off.

Group A

Round 1:
 Newcastle West 2-12, 1-3 Drom/Broadford, 15/8/2020,

Round 2:
 Ballysteen 2-9, 1-12 Drom/Broadford, 23/8/2020,Round 3: Newcastle West 2-07, 0-5 Ballysteen, 29/8/2020,

Group BRound 1: Adare 3-14, 1-04 Na Piarsaigh, 15/8/2020,Round 2: Fr. Casey's 1-13, 1-11 Na Piarsaigh, 21/8/2020,Round 3: Adare 0-12, 0-17 Fr. Casey's, 30/8/2020,

Group CRound 1: Galbally 2-7, 0-11 St. Kieran's, 16/8/2020,Round 2: Monaleen 0-11, 0-06 St. Kieran's, 21/8/2020,Round 3: Galbally 0-06, 0-12 Monaleen, 29/8/2020,

Group DRound 1: Oola 1-15, 0-11 Galtee Gaels, 16/8/2020,Round 2: Ballylanders 1-16, 0-08 Galtee Gaels, 22/8/2020,Round 3: Oola 2-08''', 0-08 Ballylanders, 29/8/2020,

Knock-out stages

Relegation play-off
The four bottom finishers from each group qualify for the Relegation Play-Off. The team to lose both matches will be relegated to the 2021 I.F.C.

Finals

Quarter-finals 
The winners and runners up of each group qualify for the quarter-finals.

Semi-finals

Final

Munster Senior Club Football Championship

References

Limerick Senior Football Championship
Limerick Senior Football Championship
Limerick SFC